Han Sang-hun (born June 3, 1980) is a former South Korean professional baseball infielder who played for the Hanwha Eagles of KBO League.

References

External links
Career statistics and player information from Korea Baseball Organization

KBO League infielders
South Korean baseball players
Hanwha Eagles players
Kyung Hee University alumni
Baseball players from Seoul
1980 births
Living people